Jacques Généreux (born ) is a French economist and politician. He is a reader of economics at the Institut d'Études Politiques de Paris.

Politically active, he opposed economic liberalism and he was close to Jean-Luc Mélenchon within the PS before having followed him to form the Left Party when he left the PS in November 2008.

In 2009, he was selected to lead the Left Front list in the West constituency ahead of the 2009 European elections.

Publications

References

1956 births
Living people
Politicians from Saint-Brieuc
Socialist Party (France) politicians
Left Party (France) politicians
La France Insoumise politicians
20th-century  French  economists
21st-century  French  economists
Sciences Po alumni